Bulstrode may refer to:

Places
 Bulstrode Park, Gerrards Cross, Buckinghamshire, England

People
 Bulstrode Whitelocke,  English lawyer
 Bulstrode (surname)

Fictional characters
 Bulstrode (Thomas the Tank Engine), a character in the Railway Series by Christopher Awdry
 Millicent Bulstrode and Violetta Bulstrode, fictional characters in the Harry Potter series
 Mr. Bulstrode, the wealthy businessman, philanthropist, and zealous Evangelical in George Eliot's novel Middlemarch
 Rev. Kevin Bulstrode, Vicar of Skurfield, a character in Paradise Postponed the novel and TV series by John Mortimer